Chaybasar-e Shomali Rural District is in Bazargan District of Maku County, West Azerbaijan province, Iran. At the National Census of 2006, its population was 11,295 in 1,972 households, when it was in the Central District. There were 4,908 inhabitants in 1,034 households at the following census of 2011, by which time the rural district was in the newly established Bazargan District. At the most recent census of 2016, the population of the rural district was 4,961 in 1,254 households. The largest of its 35 villages was Panjarlu, with 768 people.

References 

Maku County

Rural Districts of West Azerbaijan Province

Populated places in West Azerbaijan Province

Populated places in Maku County